Florida Express was an airline headquartered in Orlando, Florida, United States.  Orlando International Airport (MCO) served as the airline's hub with a point-to-point linear route system in the eastern U.S. and Florida.  Established in 1984, the air carrier operated a small fleet consisting exclusively of British Aircraft Corporation BAC One-Eleven twin jet aircraft and employed approximately 385 employees in 1985.

On March 1, 1988, Florida Express was merged into the second incarnation of Braniff (also sometimes known as "Braniff II"), initially operating as Braniff Express before being eventually integrated into the carrier. This was second time that Braniff had operated BAC One-Eleven aircraft as the original Braniff International was the first operator and launch customer of the British-manufactured twinjet in the U.S.  Several of the BAC One-Eleven jets flown by Florida Express had been formerly operated by Braniff International.  After acquiring Florida Express, Braniff then moved their corporate headquarters from Dallas, Texas to Orlando.  Braniff also continued to operate a secondary hub at the Orlando International Airport in addition to a primary hub located at the Kansas City International Airport (MCI) until this airline ceased operations due to financial challenges.

Destinations in January 1984

The following destination information is taken from the January 26, 1984 Florida Express system timetable:

 Florida
 Fort Lauderdale (FLL)
 Miami (MIA)
 Orlando (MCO - Hub)
 Tampa (TPA)
 Indiana
Indianapolis (IND)
 Kentucky
 Louisville (SDF)
 Tennessee
 Nashville (BNA)
 Virginia
 Norfolk (ORF)
 Richmond (RIC)

Destinations in April 1986

The following destination information is taken from the April 27, 1986 Florida Express system timetable:

 Alabama
 Birmingham (BHM)
 Florida
 Fort Lauderdale (FLL)
 Miami (MIA)
 Orlando (MCO - Hub) 
 St. Petersburg/Clearwater/Tampa (PIE)
 West Palm Beach (PBI)
 Indiana
 Indianapolis (IND)
 Kentucky
 Cincinnati, Ohio (CVG)
 Louisville (SDF)
 Louisiana
 New Orleans (MSY)
 Ohio (for Cincinnati, see Kentucky)
 Columbus (CMH)
 Pennsylvania
 Harrisburg (MDT)
 Wilkes-Barre / Scranton (AVP)
 Tennessee
 Knoxville (TYS)
 Nashville (BNA)

Fleet

 British Aircraft Corporation BAC One-Eleven - series 201AC, 203AE and 401AK aircraft

See also 
 List of defunct airlines of the United States

References

Defunct airlines of the United States
Airlines disestablished in 1988
1988 mergers and acquisitions
Airlines established in 1984
1984 establishments in Florida
1988 disestablishments in Florida